Central station is a common name for a railway station.

Central Station may also refer to:

Railway stations

Africa
Maputo Central Railway Station, Mozambique

Asia

Australia
Central railway station, Brisbane
Central railway station, Sydney
Gawler Central railway station, Adelaide
Wynnum Central railway station, Brisbane

Hong Kong
Central station (MTR), on the MTR metro system

India
 Chennai Central railway station 
 Chennai Central metro station
 Mangalore Central railway station
 Mumbai Central railway station
 Mumbai Central metro station
 Central metro station, of Kolkata Metro Line 1, in Kolkata
 Central Park metro station, of Kolkata Metro Line 2, in Kolkata

Malaysia
Kuala Lumpur Central Railway Station (LRT, MRT, Airport Line, bus and monorail)
Putrajaya Central Station (MRT, Airport Line, bus and proposed tram)
Kepong Central Station (Commuter and MRT)
Penang Central Station (Bus, ferry and proposed LRT and HSR)
Johor Bahru Central Railway Station (RTS, BRT, bus and CIQ to Singapore)
Kwasa Central MRT Station (MRT and bus hub)

Philippines
Central Terminal station (Line 1), in Manila

Taiwan
Central Signal railway station, in Shihzih Township, Pingtung County

Thailand
 Bang Sue Central Station
 Bangkok Railway Station

Europe

Belgium
Antwerpen-Centraal railway station, in Antwerp
Brussels Central Station

Denmark
Aarhus Central Station, in Aarhus
Copenhagen Central Station, in Copenhagen

Finland
Helsinki Central railway station
Central Railway Station metro station (Helsinki)

Netherlands
Amsterdam Centraal station
Amersfoort Centraal railway station
Arnhem Centraal railway station
Den Haag Centraal railway station (line E)
Eindhoven Centraal railway station
Leiden Centraal railway station
Rotterdam Centraal station (lines D and E)
Utrecht Centraal railway station

Norway
Oslo Central Station, in Oslo
Trondheim Central Station, in Trondheim

United Kingdom
Belfast Central railway station, now named Lanyon Place railway station
Birkenhead Central railway station
Burnley Central railway station
Cardiff Central railway station
Central railway station (London), closed
Coatbridge Central railway station
Dumbarton Central railway station
Exeter Central railway station
Finchley Central tube station
Folkestone Central railway station
Gainsborough Central railway station
Glasgow Central station
Gravesend railway station, once called Gravesend Central
Greenock Central railway station
Hackney Central railway station
Hamilton Central railway station
Heathrow Central railway station
Helensburgh Central railway station
Hendon Central tube station
Hounslow Central tube station
Hyde Central railway station
Leicester Central railway station
Lincoln Central railway station
Liverpool Central railway station
Manchester Central railway station
Milton Keynes Central railway station
New Mills Central railway station
Newcastle railway station, formerly Newcastle Central
Central Station Metro station (Tyne and Wear Metro)
Partick Central railway station, (closed)
Redcar Central railway station
Rugby Central railway station, (closed)
Rotherham Central railway station
St Helens Central railway station
St Helens Central (GCR) railway station
Southend Central railway station
Southampton Central railway station
Telford Central railway station
Tunbridge Wells railway station, once called Tunbridge Wells Central
Walthamstow Central station
Warrington Central railway station
Wembley Central station
Windsor & Eton Central railway station
Wrexham Central railway station

North America

Canada
Central station (Edmonton), Alberta
Coquitlam Central station, British Columbia
Kitchener Central Station, Ontario
Ottawa Central Station, a former intercity bus station (closed)
Montreal Central Station, Quebec
Pacific Central Station, Vancouver, British Columbia
Surrey Central station, British Columbia

Cuba
Havana Central railway station

Mexico
Central metro station (Monterrey)
Eje Central metro station, Mexico City

United States
Arizona
Central Station, in Phoenix
California
Central Station (Los Angeles), in Los Angeles
Florida
Central station (Jacksonville Skyway), in Jacksonville
Illinois
Central Station, Chicago, a neighborhood in Chicago
Central Station (Chicago terminal), in Chicago
Central station (CTA Green Line), in Chicago
Central station (CTA Congress Line), in Chicago
Central station (CTA Purple Line), in Evanston
Grand Central Station (Chicago), station for Baltimore and Ohio and other railroads, to 1969
Great Central Station, station in Chicago for Illinois Central and other railroads in the latter half of the nineteenth century
Kentucky
Central Station (Louisville), in Louisville
Massachusetts
South Station, in Boston, (at one point called South Central Station)
Central Station, a proposed station in Boston
Central station (MBTA), in Cambridge
Central Avenue station (MBTA), in Milton
Minnesota
Central station (Metro Transit), in St. Paul
Michigan
Michigan Central Station, in Detroit
New York
Buffalo Central Terminal, in Buffalo
Grand Central Terminal, in New York City
Central Avenue station (BMT Myrtle Avenue Line), in Brooklyn
Tennessee
Memphis Central Station, in Memphis
Texas
Fort Worth Central Station, in Fort Worth
Central Station (Houston), in Houston

South America

Argentina
Central Station (Buenos Aires), former railway station

Brazil
Central station (Belo Horizonte Metro)
Central station (Federal District Metro)

Other uses

Structures, establishments
Central Station (Sebring, Florida), U.S., a historic fire station
Central Police Station (Hong Kong) or Tai Kwun, a cultural and shopping destination
Alarm monitoring center, also called a central monitoring station
Power stations used to be referred to as central stations, particularly in the United States
Central Station (gay club, Moscow, Russia), a bar and night club in Moscow
Central Station (gay club, Saint-Petersburg, Russia), a bar and night club in Saint Petersburg

Art and literature 
 Central Station (film), a 1998 Brazilian film by Walter Salles
 "Central Station", a song by May-a from the 2021 EP Don't Kiss Ur Friends
 "Central Station", a song by the Boat People from the 2005 album Yesyesyesyesyes
 "Central Station", a song by Skipping Girl Vinegar from the 2011 album Keep Calm Carry the Monkey
 Central Station, a 2016 novel by Lavie Tidhar
 Central Station Records, an Australian dance music label

Other
Central Station (online service), a network gaming portal for the PlayStation 2
Central Station Design, a design company in Manchester, England

See also
 Central Bus Station (disambiguation), a list of bus stations containing the word "Central"
 Grand Central Station (disambiguation)
 Central Terminal (disambiguation)